Nature inFocus is in the space of curation and dissemination of information about India's wild spaces. It aims to do this by using photography as a tool to make these conversations accessible to everyone. This portal carries articles about wildlife, conservation, eco-travel, communities, nature art, field notes, photography tips, research etc.

It also hosts a nature and wildlife photography festival in Bangalore every year. Nature inFocus (NiF) is one festival which attracts not only nature and wildlife photographers but also researchers, conservationists, activists and nature enthusiasts in general. The festival was started back in 2014, it conducted the 5th edition of the festival in September 2018.

Some of the previous speakers include Romulus Whitaker, Steve Winter, Bittu Sahgal, Bikram Grewal, Bahar Dutt, Tui De Roy, Cristina Mittermeier, Mordecai Ogada, Trevor Frost, Rohan Chakravarty, Will Burrard-Lucas, Krithi Karanth, Aron Savio-Lobo.

The event also conducts an annual photography competition along with the festival. Over the last four years, the NiF Photographer of the Year has been awarded to Ashwini Kumar Bhat, Kallol Mukherjee, Biplab Hazra and Pratik Pradhan.

History 
Nature inFocus was founded in 2014 by Kalyan Varma and Rohit Varma, who are both wildlife photographers. On realising that there were no offline activities for the vast nature and wildlife community in the whole of Asia, the photographer-duo took it upon themselves to create a festival where photographers could showcase their work, stay informed on global happenings, meet fellow photographers, and discuss important topics. Bringing people from different disciplines together, the first edition of the Nature inFocus festival was launched in March 2014.

In 2015, Nature inFocus started working towards another first for India — nature and wildlife photography awards. Begun in 2015, the NiF Photography Awards is a six-category award ceremony that has a bracket dedicated solely to conservation-related issues. With participants from across the globe, today, to receive a NiF photography award is considered prestigious.

With amazing content pouring in from the festival and the awards, NiF’s next step was to create a space that would help archive this material for the larger public experience. In the month of November 2016, NiF launched its online portal, a photo-led exploration into India’s wilderness, a definitive and democratic platform for sharing stories and photography, enabling relevant knowledge sharing and curation of everything to do with nature. A truly community-driven platform powered by its contributors.

In 2017, Nature inFocus created the NiF Hive, a platform that allows you to create your online portfolio about nature photography. You can upload, share and curate your photographs under different categories, tagging and documenting your work in a strategic, relevant way. The Hive becomes your calling card, the repository of your best work in the wild.

In 2018, the fifth edition of the NiF Festival took place in Bangalore with a brand new film festival and a curated photography exhibition - The Wild Nation, displaying 100 images from across the country, to celebrate the richness of India's vast and diverse wilderness.

Founders

Rohit Varma 
Rohit Varma is one of those few individuals who chose to pursue passion rather than their professional career.

His love for everything nature and wildlife shouldn't surprise anyone given that he was born and raised in Balaghat, a small town bordering Kanha National Park in Madhya Pradesh, where natural beauty is in abundance.

After successfully managing multiple roles over 15 years in companies like AMD, SanDisk, CyberMedia, Rohit decided to hang up his corporate boots and decided to pursue his passion for photography and wildlife.

His work has been published in national and international media. He shares his work under creative commons. He believes that wildlife photographs can not only drive people closer to nature, they also make them experience, appreciate and conserve. His Tedx Bangalore talk on “Half a flush to save the tiger” was truly thought provoking and highlighted environmental issues in a unique fashion.

Kalyan Varma
Kalyan Varma is a wildlife photographer, filmmaker, naturalist and explorer specializing in environment, science and ecology in India. He freelances with magazines, environmental NGOs and television channels like Nat Geo and BBC.

Over the last 12 years, he has worked on wildlife series for the BBC and National Geographic channel. His work has appeared in National Geographic, Nature, The Guardian, BBC Wildlife, GEO, Smithsonian, Lonely Planet and other magazines.

Kalyan won the BBC Wildlife Photographer of the Year in 2013 and is also the winner of photographer of the year for Sanctuary magazine, Por el Planeta Mexico and Mans World, Man of the Year.

References

 http://www.thehindu.com/features/metroplus/photography-for-nature-conservation/article8811182.ece
 http://www.natgeotraveller.in/13-brilliant-wildlife-photography-moments/
 http://www.deccanherald.com/content/556450/ace-nature-shutterbugs-around-globe.html
 http://www.livemint.com/Leisure/7EA420pNSCWrKKMsTVVIJO/Photo-Essay-On-the-wild-side.html
 http://www.ndtv.com/bangalore-news/photography-exhibition-brings-together-nature-enthusiasts-in-bengaluru-778469

External links 
 

Nature photography
Photography festivals